The 2002–03 season was Aston Villa's 11th season in the Premier League, and their 15th consecutive season in the top division of English football.

Fans had hoped that the return of successful former manager Graham Taylor would spark a serious challenge for honours once more, but the actual result was Villa's worst Premier League campaign in eight years, with the club in serious danger of relegation throughout the season. Survival was only achieved in the penultimate game of the season with a victory over already-doomed Sunderland; Taylor was soon on his way out of the club for good.

Players

First-team squad
Squad at end of season

Left club during season

Reserve squad
The following players made most of their appearances for the reserves this season, but may have also appeared for the reserves or the U-17s, or may have appeared for the first team in a friendly.

U-19 squad
The following players made most of their appearances for the U-19s this season, but may have also appeared for the reserves or the U-17s.

U-17 squad
The following players made most of their appearances for the U-17s this season, but may have also appeared for the reserves or the U-19s.

Other players
The following players did not play for any Aston Villa team this season.

Statistics

Appearances and goals
As of end of season

|-
! colspan=14 style=background:#dcdcdc; text-align:center| Goalkeepers

|-
! colspan=14 style=background:#dcdcdc; text-align:center| Defenders

|-
! colspan=14 style=background:#dcdcdc; text-align:center| Midfielders

|-
! colspan=14 style=background:#dcdcdc; text-align:center| Forwards

|-
! colspan=14 style=background:#dcdcdc; text-align:center| Players transferred out during the season

Starting 11

Results

Pre-season

FA Premier League

Final standings

FA Cup

League Cup

Transfers

In

Out

See also
Aston Villa F.C. seasons

References

Notes

External links
Aston Villa official website
avfchistory.co.uk 2002–03 season

2002-03
Aston Villa